Carsten Diercks (1921 - 2 November 2009) was a German documentary filmmaker.

Diercks started his career after World War II at the radio station of the Nordwestdeutscher Rundfunk. 1952 he became cinematographer with NWDR TV station. In 1953, he participated in the first tests of pilot tone. During his long occupation for the network, he made some 500 documentaries as cinematographer, director or executive producer. He was the driving representative of the so-called Hamburgian school, which aimed to comply the documentary genre with new requirements of television broadcasting.

In 1959, he worked as a consultant for Minister of Information and Broadcasting Indira Gandhi to build up a national TV network in India
He was decorated with the Bundesverdienstkreuz.

Filmography
 1955: Netz über Bord - Heringsfang auf der Nordsee

References

External links
 Short biography of Carsten Diercks at Filmmuseum Hamburg (some examples of his work in for RealPlayer)
 Die Welt kommt in die Stube, DJV-Info, Issue 1/2001, S. 8

1921 births
2009 deaths
German documentary filmmakers
Mass media people from Kiel
Commanders Crosses of the Order of Merit of the Federal Republic of Germany
Film people from Schleswig-Holstein